is a passenger railway station in the town of Miyashiro, Saitama, Japan, operated by the private railway operator Tōbu Railway.

Lines

Station layout
This station has one island platform connected to the station building by an underground passage.

Platforms

Adjacent stations

History
Wado Station opened on 20 December 1899.

From 17 March 2012, station numbering was introduced on all Tōbu lines, with Wado Station becoming "TI-01".

Passenger statistics
In fiscal 2019, the station was used by an average of 4102 passengers daily.

Surrounding area
 Miyashiro-Wado Post Office
 Miyashiro Municipal Suga Elementary School
 Miyashiro Municipal Suga Junior High School

See also
 List of railway stations in Japan

References

External links

 Tobu station information 

Tobu Isesaki Line
Stations of Tobu Railway
Railway stations in Saitama Prefecture
Railway stations in Japan opened in 1899
Miyashiro, Saitama